Martine Rustøen Skregelid (born 6 July 1999 in Bærum) is a Norwegian artistic gymnast. She represented her country in the 2014 Youth Olympic Games, but did not make any finals. She was also chosen to compete at the first European Games in Baku, along with teammates Solveig Berg and Sofie Bråten, and placed 23rd as a team. In 2017 she became The northern european champion. 

She is two time national champion and she has won many national titles both as junior and senior. She has now ended her career.

References

External links
http://www.baku2015.com/athletes/athlete=skregelid-martine-1010820/index.html?intcmp=athletes-hub

1999 births
Living people
Sportspeople from Bærum
Norwegian female artistic gymnasts
Gymnasts at the 2014 Summer Youth Olympics
Junior artistic gymnasts
Gymnasts at the 2015 European Games
European Games competitors for Norway
21st-century Norwegian women